A propelling control vehicle (PCV) is a type of British railway carriage for carrying mail. They were converted from Class 307 driving trailers and have a cab at one end which allows slow-speed movement control. PCVs are unpowered but the controls allow mail trains to be reversed at low speed, using the power of the locomotive at the other end of the train. Similar BR Class 91 driving van trailer (DVT) used on the ECML differ by being fully equipped for high-speed train control. 

Forty-two PCVs were converted by Hunslet-Barclay in Kilmarnock from 1994 to 1996. The rebuilding work including removal of the windows and slam-doors, the fitting of roller shutter doors, and modernisation of the cab. The vehicles were given the TOPS code NAA and numbered 94300–94327 and 94331–94345. The first two vehicles converted were prototypes, and were extensively tested to iron out any problems. The subsequent 40 vehicles incorporated modifications as a result of this testing. At the same time these vehicles were converted, the Class 47/7 locomotives that hauled mail trains were modified to be able to work in push-pull mode with the PCVs.

When first converted the vehicles were used by the Rail Express Systems parcels sector of British Rail. They were painted in Rail Express Systems red/grey livery with light blue flashes. PCVs were marshalled at either end of mail trains that worked into London termini, which removed the need for the locomotive to run round the train at its destination. Trains were propelled only at low speed, not for long distances.

In 1996 Rail Express Systems was sold to EWS, who continued to operate mail trains on behalf of Royal Mail. PCVs were used on trains between London and Norwich, Plymouth, Bristol, Swansea, Newcastle and Glasgow. PCVs were also used on travelling post office trains from London to Plymouth, Newcastle, Norwich, Carlisle and Glasgow.

The two prototype PCVs, nos. 94300/1, were non-standard. Consequently, they were used as standard mail coaches on a new high-speed mail train from Walsall to Inverness, painted in EWS maroon/gold livery and renumbered 95300/1.

In early 2004, EWS lost the contract to transport mail. As a result, all PCVs except initially 95300/1 were withdrawn from service, pending new traffic, sale or scrapping. After a limited amount of residual traffic, and trials for possible use for the movement of secure goods, 95300 and 95301 were also withdrawn. 94320 was preserved by the Mid-Norfolk Railway in April 2009, with 95301 being preserved at the Andrew Briddon Locomotives site at Darley Dale in September 2016.

Fleet details 
The table below shows details of the fleet, including numbering and disposition.

See also 
 Control car - a passenger car with a train control cab used in push-pull service.

British Rail coaching stock